Anton Schrödl (19 February 1820, Schwechat - 5 July 1906, Vienna) was an Austrian painter of animals and genre scenes.

Biography 
His ancestry can be traced back to 1428; to the Imperial Toll Collector in Ybbs, Hans Schrötel von Schröttenstein. His father, Joseph Schrödl, was an iron merchant. His older brother, Norbert Michael Schrödl  (1816–1890), was an ivory carver and sculptor whose sons,  and  also became artists (a painter and sculptor, respectively).

When he was still very young, his family's financial circumstances worsened and he was placed under the guardianship of a relative in Vienna. At the age of only thirteen, he was able to enroll at the Academy of Fine Arts, where he studied with the flower painter, and was awarded the Gundel-Prize for excellence in 1835. He began his career as a lithographer for the art publishing firm of "Matthäus und Joseph Trentsensky". Animals and landscape paintings were his specialties. He first attracted notice in 1841, at one of the Academy's exhibitions.

Between 1860 and 1870, he worked as a garden designer. His major project was the "Tiergarten am Schüttel", a zoo at the Prater, which closed in 1901. 

He travelled widely every summer, including a trip to Algeria with Count Johann Nepomuk Wilczek in 1870, which produced some very popular lithographs. But, despite his successes, his financial situation was never secure, so he was forced to auction off his remaining works in 1899. 

He was married, but had no children. He died, aged eighty-six, in Vienna's Leopoldstadt district and was interred at the Wiener Zentralfriedhof. His estate was auctioned off in 1907, at the Vienna Künstlerhaus.

Selected paintings

Sources

External links 

 More works by Schrödl @ ArtNet
 Anton Schrödl @ the Wien Geschichte Wiki

1820 births
1906 deaths
Austrian painters
Animal painters
Austrian landscape painters
Academy of Fine Arts Vienna alumni
People from Schwechat